ME... is the second studio album released by the J-Urban artist Emi Hinouchi. It was released on December 3, 2008. It reached the 64th place on the Oricon Weekly Albums Chart.

Track listing 
 O'kay
 Music of Love / 日之内エミ x SOFFet
 片想い
 恋はリルラリ
 chocolate
 夏恋 / 日之内エミ & Ryohei
 GOODIE MEMORIES
 Get up!
 ファーストデート
 I Love You
 Heart feel vacances
 愛だけが
 interlude ～in my dream～
 Grow
 E・S・C・A・P・E
 TWINKLE STAR (SHINE ON ME ver.) / MAKAI

References

2008 albums